"Reign of X" is a 2020 relaunch of the X-Men line of comic books published by Marvel Comics. It is the sequel to the "Dawn of X" publishing initiative, and was followed by an additional relaunch titled "Destiny of X".

Publication history
The "Dawn of X" initiative was announced at "The Next Big Thing" panel at San Diego Comic-Con 2019, intending to tell the story of mutantkind in a new status quo established by Jonathan Hickman after the House of X/Powers of X (HOX/POX) event concludes, redefining X-Men as a brand and its place in the Marvel Universe, with all creative teams working closely under Hickman's supervision.

Development
"Dawn of X" concluded with the crossover event X of Swords, which initiated a sequel relaunch titled "Reign of X" in December 2020. This phase saw the line come together for the Hellfire Gala event, as well as Jonathan Hickman's departure from the line with the miniseries Inferno. "Reign of X" concluded with the twin event series X Lives of Wolverine and X Deaths of Wolverine, during which the majority of the line (aside from X-Men, New Mutants, and Sabretooth) was put on pause. X Lives and X Deaths then served as the foundation of a new relaunch titled "Destiny of X".

Titles

Ongoing series

Limited series

One-shots

Release order

 Hellions #7
 X-Factor #5
 S.W.O.R.D. #1
 Marauders #16
 New Mutants #14
 X-Force #15
 Excalibur #16
 X-Men #16
 Wolverine #8
 X-Factor #6
 Hellions #8
 Marauders #17
 S.W.O.R.D. #2
 Cable #7
 X-Force #16
 New Mutants #15
 Excalibur #17
 Wolverine #9
 X-Men #17
 X-Factor #7
 Hellions #9
 King in Black: Marauders #1
 S.W.O.R.D. #3
 X-Force #17
 Excalibur #18
 Marauders #18
 Cable #8
 New Mutants #16
 Wolverine #10
 X-Men #18
 Hellions #10
 Children of the Atom #1
 X-Factor #8
 S.W.O.R.D. #4
 X-Force #18
 Cable #9
 Excalibur #19
 X-Men #19
 Excalibur #20
 Marauders #19
 Children of the Atom #2
 Wolverine #11
 S.W.O.R.D. #5
 Way of X #1
 X-Force #19
 Cable #10
 New Mutants #17
 Hellions #11
 Marauders #20
 Children of the Atom #3
 X-Corp #1
 X-Factor #9
 Way of X #2
 Wolverine #12
 New Mutants #18
 X-Men #20
 Marauders #21
 X-Force #20
 Hellions #12
 Excalibur #21
 X-Men #21
 Children of the Atom #4
 Planet-Size X-Men #1
 New Mutants #19
 X-Corp #2
 Wolverine #13
 S.W.O.R.D. #6
 Way of X #3
 X-Factor #10
 Cable #11
 Children of the Atom #5
 Hellions #13
 X-Force #21
 X-Men #1
 Excalibur #22
 Way of X #4
 X-Corp #3
 Marauders #22
 New Mutants #20
 Cable #12
 S.W.O.R.D. #7
 Wolverine #14
 Hellions #14
 X-Men #2
 Children of the Atom #6
 X-Force #22
 Marauders #23
 Way of X #5
 X-Corp #4
 X-Men: The Trial of Magneto #1
 Cable: Reloaded  #1
 Wolverine #15
 Hellions #15
 New Mutants #21
 Excalibur #23
 X-Force #23
 Marauders #24
 X-Men: The Trial of Magneto #2
 X-Corp #5
 X-Men #3
 X-Men: The Onslaught Revelation #1
 Inferno #1
 S.W.O.R.D. #8
 Wolverine #16
 Excalibur #24
 Hellions #16
 New Mutants #22
 X-Force #24
 X-Men #4
 X-Men: The Trial of Magneto #3
 Inferno #2
 Marauders #25
 S.W.O.R.D. #9
 Wolverine #17
 Excalibur #25
 Hellions #17
 S.W.O.R.D. #10
 X-Force #25
 Wolverine #18
 X-Men #5
 Marauders #26
 New Mutants #23
 X-Men: The Trial of Magneto #4
 Hellions #18
 Inferno #3
 Excalibur #26
 X-Force #26
 S.W.O.R.D. #11
 Wolverine #19
 X-Men: The Trial of Magneto #5
 Inferno #4
 X-Men #6
 Marauders #27
 Devil's Reign: X-Men #1
 X Lives of Wolverine #1
 Marauders Annual #1
 X Deaths of Wolverine #1
 X-Men #7
 X Lives of Wolverine #2
 New Mutants #24
 Secret X-Men #1
 X Deaths of Wolverine #2
 X-Men #8
 X Lives of Wolverine #3
 X Deaths of Wolverine #3
 Devil's Reign: X-Men #2
 X-Men #9
 X Lives of Wolverine #4
 X Deaths of Wolverine #4
 X Lives of Wolverine #5
 Devil's Reign: X-Men #3
 X Deaths of Wolverine #5

Reading order
Issues marked in bold are marked as red/important in the issue list found in the back of each comic.

 Hellions #7–11
 X-Factor #5–7
 S.W.O.R.D. #1
 Marauders #16
 New Mutants #14–18
 X-Force #15–19
 Excalibur #16–20
 X-Men #16
 Wolverine #8–10
 X-Factor #8
 Marauders #17
 S.W.O.R.D. #2–4
 Cable #7–10
 X-Men #17
 King in Black: Marauders #1
 Marauders #18–20
 X-Men #18–19
 Children of the Atom #1–3
 Wolverine #11–12
 S.W.O.R.D. #5
 Way of X #1–2
 X-Corp #1
 Marauders #21
 X-Force #20
 Hellions #12
 Excalibur #21
 X-Men #21
 Children of the Atom #4
 Planet-Size X-Men #1
 New Mutants #19
 X-Corp #2
 Wolverine #13
 S.W.O.R.D. #6
 Way of X #3
 X-Factor #10
 Cable #11
 Children of the Atom #5
 Hellions #13
 X-Force #21
 X-Men #1
 Excalibur #22
 Way of X #4
 X-Corp #3
 Marauders #22
 New Mutants #20
 Hellions #14
 X-Men #2
 Children of the Atom #6
 X-Force #22
 Marauders #23
 Way of X #5
 X-Men: The Onslaught Revelation #1
 X-Corp #4
 X-Men: The Trial of Magneto #1
 Wolverine #15
 Hellions #15
 New Mutants #21
 Excalibur #23
 X-Force #23
 Marauders #24
 X-Men: The Trial of Magneto #2
 X-Corp #5
 X-Men #3
 Inferno #1
 S.W.O.R.D #8
 Wolverine'' #16

Related material

Collected editions

References